Marijana Šurković (born February 14, 1984 in Dubrovnik) is a retired female freestyle swimmer from Croatia, who competed for her native country at the 2000 Summer Olympics in Sydney, Australia. There she ended up in 46th place in the women's 50 meter freestyle event, clocking 27.32 in the qualifying heats.

References
 sports-reference
 Profile

1984 births
Living people
Croatian female swimmers
Croatian female freestyle swimmers
Olympic swimmers of Croatia
Swimmers at the 2000 Summer Olympics
Sportspeople from Dubrovnik
21st-century Croatian women